West Lebanon may refer to:
West Lebanon, Indiana, United States
West Lebanon, New Hampshire, United States
West Lebanon, Ohio, an unincorporated community
West Lebanon, Pennsylvania, United States